was a Japanese religious scholar and a popular contemporary writer of Buddhism.

He was born in Osaka Prefecture and studied Indian philosophy at University of Tokyo, graduating in 1960. Under the pen name Hiro Sachiya (derived from the Sanskrit Satya), he has written more than 400 books and articles. His interest in religion is not limited to Buddhism.  He is mostly known for his comparative studies in all religions including Buddhism, Shinto, Christianity, Islam, and Confucianism.

Selected bibliography
　(1981)
 (1982)
 (1984)
 (1986)
 (1987)

References 

1936 births
2022 deaths
People from Osaka
Buddhist writers
Japanese scholars of Buddhism